Cape Peninsula University of Technology is a university in Cape Town, South Africa. It is the only university of technology in the Western Cape province, and is also the largest university in the province, with over 32,000 students. It was formed by merging the Cape Technikon and Peninsula Technikon as well as a few other independent colleges.

History

It was formed in January 2005 from the merger of the Cape Technikon and Peninsula Technikon, following years of change in the higher education landscape of South Africa.  In 1993, the Technikons Act was promulgated, which allowed technikons to offer bachelor's degrees (B.Tech), master's and doctoral degrees in Technology.  In March 2001, Kader Asmal (then Minister of Education) announced the National Plan on Higher Education, and in May 2002 he announced the possible merger of the two institutions, with the national working committee also recommending the University of the Western Cape to be included in the merger.  Towards the end of 2002, the final merger was announced, and in October 2003 the new name was approved. The Executive Interim Management was appointed towards the end of 2004.

Prof. L Vuyisa Mazwi-Tanga was appointed as the first vice-chancellor of CPUT in February 2006.  Also at this time, the nine faculties of the original institutions were merged and re-organised into six:  Applied Science, Business, Education and Social Sciences, Engineering, Health and Wellness Sciences, and Informatics & Design.  A separate postgraduate unit was established to offer multidisciplinary postgraduate programmes and funded research known as the e-Innovation Academy, and as from March 2008 the Faculty of Informatics & Design Research Unit. The Department of Information Technology in collaboration with the Bridgetown Community, Athlone, COFISA and IDM launched the Athlone Living lab, a community ICT innovation project, in September 2008. This would be the first Living Lab in the Western Cape.

Trevor Manuel was appointed chancellor of the university in April 2008.

Foreign students (those from outside the SADC), are required to pay double the fees of local students. There are currently just over 2000 international students enrolled.

The university offers bursaries to master's and doctoral degree students.

Campuses

CPUT has five campuses:
 The Bellville Campus, formerly the campus of the Peninsula Technikon
 The Cape Town Campus, formerly the campus of the Cape Technikon in Zonnebloem
 The Mowbray Campus, formerly the Mowbray College of Education
 The Granger Bay Campus, housing the Cape Town Hotel School and the Survival Centre
 The Wellington Campus, formerly the Boland College of Education

The Cape Town Campus is built on a portion of District Six.

Co-operative education 
The large majority of courses offered by CPUT incorporate in-service training; the training consists of an internship, usually six months to a year. The university's comprehensive co-operative education policy ensures the student is placed within a company approved by the university; this ensures that institutional academic learning is incorporated into work-based content.

Sport 
The university has a well known sports program. A notable member of the basketball team is Brendan Mettler, who played in the starting lineup of the South Africa national basketball team at the 2011 African Basketball Championship in Madagascar.

Notable people 
 Zozibini Tunzi – Miss Universe 2019

See also
 Open access in South Africa and List of South African open access repositories

References

External links 
Official site
The Information Society Institute (an initiative of CPUT)

Universities in the Western Cape
Public universities in South Africa
Education in Cape Town
Educational institutions established in 2005
2005 establishments in South Africa
Academic staff of Cape Peninsula University of Technology